Cole Guttman (born April 6, 1999) is an American professional ice hockey player for the  Chicago Blackhawks of the National Hockey League (NHL).

Playing career
Growing up in Los Angeles, Guttman played youth hockey for several local California-based minor teams before eventually working his way up to the Dubuque Fighting Saints of the United States Hockey League. In his first full season with the Fighting Saints, Guttman scored 54 points in 53 games, catching the attention of the Tampa Bay Lightning, who drafted him in the sixth round of the 2017 NHL Entry Draft. Guttman was named captain of Dubuque prior to his selection in the NHL draft; his sophomore USHL season saw a decrease in production. Although initially committed to the St. Cloud University, Gutzmann ultimately enrolled at the University of Denver in 2018, where he played for the school's Pioneers ice hockey club for all four years of his schooling. In 2021, he served as captain of the Pioneers. In his final season with Denver, he captained the team to the 2022 NCAA championship.

Tampa Bay did not sign Guttman to a contract prior to his rights expiring on August 15, 2022, making Guttman an unrestricted free agent. On August 18, Guttman inked a two-year, entry level contract with the Chicago Blackhawks worth $950,000 annually, the maximum allowable on rookie contracts. Chicago, who at the time was considered to have a weak forward prospect pool, were intrigued by Guttman's potential NHL ceiling.

Guttman was assigned to Chicago's American Hockey League affiliate team, the Rockford Icehogs, for his first professional season. He would collect 30 points in 39 games with the Icehogs before being called up by the Blackhawks on February 15, 2023, amid a flurry of recent injuries for the club. He made his NHL debut that evening, playing just over twelve minutes in a loss to the Toronto Maple Leafs. On February 20, in his third career game, Guttman scored his first NHL goal again in a match against the Toronto Maple Leafs. Guttman appeared in 14 games with the Blackhawks, registering 4 goals and 6 points, before undergoing season-ending shoulder surgery on March 14, 2023.

Personal life
Guttman's family were originally from Hungary. After surviving the Holocaust, the Guttmans made their way to North America via a displaced persons camp.

Cole was born in Los Angeles, to parents Brent and Julie Guttman. He has a younger brother, Jeremy, who attends the University of Michigan. Guttman's favourite musical artist is Post Malone. He is a fan of the Los Angeles Dodgers.

Career statistics

Awards and honours

References

External links
 

1999 births
Chicago Blackhawks players
Denver Pioneers men's ice hockey players
Dubuque Fighting Saints players
Ice hockey people from California
Jewish ice hockey players
Living people
People from Northridge, Los Angeles
Rockford IceHogs (AHL) players
Tampa Bay Lightning draft picks
USA Hockey National Team Development Program players